Tariq Masood Niazi (15 March 1940 – 20 April 2008) was a Pakistani field hockey player between 1961 and 1969 and member of the Olympic team. Niazi was part of the 1964 games in Tokyo where they won a silver medal and the 1968 games in Mexico City where they won the gold. He competed in the Asian Games. Mianwali’s municipal hockey stadium was renamed Tariq Niazi Hockey Stadium in Niazi's honor.

Niazi died on 20 April 2008 of a cardiac arrest.

References

External links
 
 Tariq Niazi – databaseOlympics Page
 Pakistan Hockey Team

1940 births
2008 deaths
Pakistani male field hockey players
Olympic field hockey players of Pakistan
Olympic gold medalists for Pakistan
Olympic silver medalists for Pakistan
Olympic medalists in field hockey
Medalists at the 1964 Summer Olympics
Medalists at the 1968 Summer Olympics
Field hockey players at the 1964 Summer Olympics
Field hockey players at the 1968 Summer Olympics
Asian Games medalists in field hockey
Field hockey players at the 1962 Asian Games
Field hockey players at the 1966 Asian Games
Pashtun people
Asian Games gold medalists for Pakistan
Asian Games silver medalists for Pakistan
Medalists at the 1962 Asian Games
Medalists at the 1966 Asian Games
20th-century Pakistani people